The Battle of Lemberg on September 6, 1704, was a successful Swedish assault on the town of Lemberg (Lviv), in the Polish–Lithuanian Commonwealth, during the Great Northern War.

Prelude
The governor of Lemberg, Franciszek Gałecki, had earlier refused to pay a contribution demanded by the Swedes. Charles XII of Sweden, likely angered by this, struck camp at Jarosław, on September 1, and marched towards Lemberg with 16 regiments. He arrived with his vanguard on September 5 and immediately drove off a force of around two thousand under Janusz Antoni Wiśniowiecki and Stanisław Mateusz Rzewuski, after a brief fight. The garrison, about 600 strong (including 200 Saxons), then quickly scorched the suburbs and opened fire with cannons.

Battle
Charles, who wanted to storm the town immediately, proceeded with a reconnaissance from the High Castle and ordered three dragoon regiments to prepare to attack; heavy rain, however, forced him to postpone it until the following day. While the dragoon regiments made preparations, the rest of the force encircled the town to block any relief forces. The following day, September 6, the attack was carried out. About 50 Swedes stormed a fortified monastery outside the town, while Charles with the remainder of the force climbed the earthwork, where a wooden wall had to be cut through. This protected the large fortification walls directly surrounding the town. As they attacked, they were shot at through the portholes of the wooden wall. The defenders were, however, effectively forced away by grenades. As the Swedes broke through, the defenders panicked and ran towards the main gate accessing the town, with Charles pursuing them. In the chaos, the Swedes managed to take control of the gate, then the town square, and soon the whole town, all in half an hour. The fortified monastery had also been captured.

Aftermath
Between 30 and 40 Swedes had been killed or wounded during the fighting while the garrison lost about 530 men captured and between 50 and 60 killed, apart from a few armed citizens. Franciszek Gałecki, along with his captured men (with the exception of the Saxons), soon went over to the side of Stanisław Leszczyński and the Swedes, and were once again garrisoned in Lemberg. Charles struck camp with his forces on September 23-24, and marched towards Warsaw which had been captured by Augustus II of Poland. He soon caught up with the Saxon forces, under Johann Matthias von der Schulenburg, at the Battle of Punitz.

Sources

Notes

References

Bibliography
 
Fryxell, Anders (1861). Lebensgeschichte Karl des Zwölften, Königs von Schweden, Vol. 1, Brunswick
 Lundblad, Knut (1835). Geschichte Karl des Zwölften Königs von Schweden, Vol. 1, Hamburg
 
 
 Tessin, Georg (1967). Die deutschen Regimenter der Krone Schweden: Unter Karl X. Gustav (1654–1660), Böhlau
 Voltaire (1761) Geschichte Carls XII., Frankfurt am Main.

Lemberg

1704 in Europe

Lemberg

Lemberg

Lemberg

1704 in the Polish–Lithuanian Commonwealth